St Stephen's House is an Anglican theological college and one of five permanent private halls of the University of Oxford, England. It will cease to be a permanent private hall in September 2023 and will be officially granted the status of an Anglican theological college.

The college has a very small proportion of undergraduate students (just 4 in the academic year 2019–2020), but has graduate students in a number of fields including theology, Byzantine studies, education, and music. At any time, roughly one quarter of the students are pursuing professional training as classroom teachers, and another quarter professional theological and ministerial training as priests, with the other half following a diverse range of studies and research.

History

St Stephen's House was founded in 1876 by members of the Oxford Movement within the Church of England, and was originally located in the very centre of Oxford, on what is today the site of the New Bodleian Library. Its principal founder was Edward King, Regius Professor of Moral and Pastoral Theology at Oxford and later Bishop of Lincoln.

In 1919 the college relocated to new buildings in Norham Gardens, near to the University Parks and Lady Margaret Hall. The college moved again in 1980, having outgrown its earlier buildings, and now occupies the former Anglican Monastery of the Society of St. John the Evangelist (Cowley Fathers).

The college was an "Associated Institution" of the University of Oxford, able to matriculate students in the fields of theology and philosophy, until 2003, when it became a permanent private hall of the university.

Buildings
The college is located in east Oxford, between the Iffley and Cowley Roads (to west and east) and James Street and Marston Street (to north and south), with entrances onto all these roads. Although there are some modern buildings, notably the Moberly Close residential accommodation building, most of the college buildings are older, and have listed status.

Grade I listing applies to the Church of St John the Evangelist, which is the principal college chapel, and an arts centre, as well as housing some teaching and research facilities in its sacristies and song school. Constructed in 1894–1896 to a design by George Frederick Bodley (1827–1907), it has held grade I listing since 1968. The castellated west tower was added in 1902. The east, west, and north-east windows contain stained glass designed by C. E. Kempe (1837–1907) and made in about 1900.
The Church also contains painted Stations of the Cross by the late Pre-Raphaelite artist, Edward Arthur Fellowes Prynne, created for the Cowley Fathers between 1918 and 1921.
 
Grade II listing was applied to the bulk of the college's other central buildings in 1992. This listing includes the college's main cloister built in 1899 to a design by Bodley, the three lesser cloisters, the Benson Building (residential and teaching accommodation built late nineteenth century, probably designed by Clapton Crabb Rolfe), the King Building (residential, teaching, and administrative accommodation, including the college refectory, the library, and the common room, also designed by Bodley), and the two smaller chapels – the Founders Chapel, and the Ninian Comper designed House Chapel.

St John's Church (and sometimes also the college cloisters) has been since 2012 the performance and display venue for SJE Arts Oxford, a society promoting performing arts and music, and which organises an annual summer choral festival at the college site.

The Song School, once the music department of SSJE, and later the residence of the college's vice principal, has since 2008 housed the  Centre for Muslim-Christian Studies, Oxford, an independent body whose senior teaching and research staff are mostly current or former members of the Faculty of Theology and Religion, University of Oxford.

Arms
In 2020, St Stephen's House was granted by the College of Arms the current arms Per chevron Gules and Sable in chief two Cross crosslets and in base a Celestial Crown Or and badge A Cross Crosslet Or surmounted by a closed Book Gules leaved Argent and charged with a key wards upwards Or. The badge is used on the college sports kit.

Prior to this, the college used the assumed arms Gules a Celestial Crown between three Bezants two and one Or, on a chief Sable an Apostolic Eagle between two Crosses crosslet Or.

Principals and fellows

Principals

The Head of House is known as the "principal." To date, every person to have held the office has been an ordained Anglican priest.
1876–1877 (res.): Robert Moberly
1877–1881: ?
1881–1884 (res.): John Octavius Johnston
1884–1885 (res.): Berkeley Randolph
1885–1888 (res.): Charles Myers
1888–1895 (res.): Hugh Currie
1895–1903 (res.): Charles Plumb
1903–1917 (res.): George Bown
1917–1919: ?
1919–1936 (res.): Gilbert Mitchell
1936–1962 (res.): Arthur Couratin
1962–1974 (res.): Derek Allen
1974–1982 (res.): David Hope
1982–1987 (res.): David Thomas
1987–1995 (res.): Edwin Barnes
1996–2006 (res.): Jeremy Sheehy
2006–present: Robin Ward

Honorary research fellows
Notable honorary research fellows have included:
Andrew Linzey, theologian, author and prominent figure in the Christian vegetarianism movement 
James Whitbourn, conductor and composer
Luke Miller, Archdeacon of London
Norman Russell, former Archdeacon of Berkshire

Alumni

Many former students, in the tradition of the college, go on to minister in urban priority areas and parishes which suffer poverty and deprivation. The following are amongst the notable former students:
 Jonathan Baker –  Bishop of Fulham and the former Bishop of Ebbsfleet
 Norman Banks –  Honorary Chaplain to the Queen and Bishop of Richborough
 J. W. B. Barns – Professor of Egyptology at the University of Oxford
 Mark Bonney — Dean of Ely
 Andrew Burnham – former Bishop of Ebbsfleet and former vice principal
 Anthony Caesar – composer
 Alan Chesters – former Bishop of Blackburn
 David Conner –  Dean of Windsor (since 1998)
 Stephen Cottrell – Archbishop of York (since 2020)
 Ivor Gordon Davies – Archdeacon of Lewisham from 1972 to 1985.
 Roy Davies – Bishop of Llandaff from 1985 to 1999
 Hovnan Derderian – Primate of the Western Diocese of the Armenian Church of North America
 Mark Elvins – Roman Catholic priest and Warden of Greyfriars, Oxford 
 Walter Hooper – literary advisor to the estate of CS Lewis
 William Howard, 8th Earl of Wicklow – Irish peer
 David Jasper – Professor of Literature and Theology at the University of Glasgow
 Jeffrey John – Dean of St Albans
 Eric Kemp – former Bishop of Chichester
 Peter Laister –  Rector of Saint Clement's Church, Philadelphia,  from 1986 to 1993
 Kenneth Leech – priest and Christian socialist
 Trevor Mwamba – Bishop of Botswana, appears as himself in The No. 1 Ladies' Detective Agency
 Philip North – Bishop of Burnley
 Mark Oakley – Canon Chancellor of St Paul's Cathedral, London
 Gordon Roe – former Bishop of Huntingdon
 John Saward –  theologian, fellow of Greyfriars, Oxford
 David Silk – former Bishop of Ballarat in the Anglican Church of Australia
 Glyn Simon – former Archbishop of Wales
 Michael Spence – vice-chancellor of the University of Sydney
 Tim Thornton – Bishop of Truro
 Stephen Venner – Bishop to the Forces and Bishop for the Falkland Islands
 Martin Warner – Bishop of Chichester
 William Gordon Wheeler –  former Roman Catholic Bishop of Leeds
 Colin Williams – General Secretary of the Conference of European Churches
 A. N. Wilson – writer and newspaper columnist, left after his first year

See also
 St John the Evangelist Church, Oxford

References

External links

 St Stephen's House website
 St John the Evangelist church website
 Virtual tour of St Stephen's House

 
1876 establishments in England
Permanent private halls of the University of Oxford
Anglo-Catholic educational establishments
Anglican seminaries and theological colleges
Bible colleges, seminaries and theological colleges in England
Buildings and structures of the University of Oxford
Anglican buildings and structures in Europe